GPR endopeptidase (germination proteinase) is an enzyme. This enzyme catalyses the following chemical reaction:

 Endopeptidase action with P4 Glu or Asp, P1 preferably Glu > Asp, P1' hydrophobic and P2' Ala

This enzyme participates in spore germination in Bacillus megaterium.

References

External links 
 

EC 3.4.24